is Mai Kuraki's twenty-eighth single, released on March 19, 2008. It was released in both limited and regular editions. The limited edition comes with an Eco bag (in natural, pink or green colors) as well as a bonus instrumental piano version of "You and Music and Dream". This single is her first to have two different covers.

Usage in media
 NTV "The 4400 Season 1 Michi kara no Seikansha" theme song (#1) NTV link
 TBS "Chikyuu Sousei Mystery Mother Planet Kiseki no Shima, Galapagos "Inochi" no Isan" image song (#2)

Track listing

Charts

Oricon Sales Chart

Billboard Japan Sales Chart

External links
Kuraki Mai Official Website

2008 singles
Mai Kuraki songs
Songs with music by Akihito Tokunaga
Song recordings produced by Daiko Nagato